Kaiso is a settlement in Western Uganda.

Location
Kaiso is located on the eastern shores of Lake Albert, in Hoima District. The coordinates of Kaiso are:1°31'48.0"N, 30°57'58.0"E (Latitude:1.5300; Longitude:30.9661).

Overview
Kaiso lies in the oil-rich Albertine Graben. Tullow Oil, one of the international oil companies prospecting in the area has built social enterprise infrastructure in or near Kaiso, worth US$2.6 million, including Kyehoro Maternity Health Centre, Sebagoro Health Centre III, Kaiso Primary School, and Kyehoro Primary School.

See also
Tonya, Uganda
Nzizi Power Station
Uganda Oil Refinery
Uganda-Kenya Crude Oil Pipeline
Hoima–Kampala Petroleum Products Pipeline

References

External links
 Oil Opens New Chapter for Hoima Residents

Populated places in Western Region, Uganda
Cities in the Great Rift Valley
Hoima District